Richard Whalley Anthony Curtis  (born 8 November 1956) is a British screenwriter, producer and film director. One of Britain's most successful comedy screenwriters, he is known primarily for romantic comedy films, among them Four Weddings and a Funeral (1994), Notting Hill (1999), Bridget Jones's Diary (2001), Love Actually (2003), Bridget Jones: The Edge of Reason (2004), About Time (2013) and Yesterday (2019). He is also known for the drama War Horse (2011) and for having co-written the sitcoms Blackadder, Mr. Bean and The Vicar of Dibley. His early career saw him write material for the BBC's Not the Nine O'Clock News and ITV's Spitting Image.

In 2007, Curtis received the BAFTA Fellowship for lifetime achievement from the British Academy of Film and Television Arts. He is the co-founder, with Sir Lenny Henry, of the British charity Comic Relief, which has raised over £1 billion. At the 2008 Britannia Awards, he received the BAFTA Humanitarian Award for co-creating Comic Relief and for his contributions to other charitable causes.

Curtis was listed in The Observer as one of the 50 funniest figures in British comedy in 2003. In 2008, he was ranked number 12 in a list of the "100 most powerful people in British culture" compiled by The Telegraph. In 2012, he was one of the British cultural icons selected by artist Sir Peter Blake to appear in a new version of his most famous artwork—the cover of The Beatles' 1967 album Sgt. Pepper's Lonely Hearts Club Band.

Early life and education
Curtis was born in Wellington, New Zealand. He is the son of Glyness S. and Anthony J. Curtis. His father was a Czechoslovakian refugee who moved to Australia when aged thirteen and became an executive at Unilever. Curtis and his family lived in several different countries during his childhood, including Sweden and the Philippines, before moving to Great Britain when he was 11.

Curtis attended Papplewick School in Ascot, Berkshire (as did his younger brother Jamie). For a short period in the 1970s, he lived in Warrington, Cheshire, where he attended Appleton Grammar School (now Bridgewater High School). He then won a scholarship to Harrow School, where he joined the editorial team of The Harrovian, the weekly school magazine, and this, he asserts, is “where I learned all the skills that made me a sketch writer. I did reviews, comment pieces and funny articles where I’d try to conjure something out of nothing.” While at Harrow, Curtis directed a school performance of Joe Orton's play  The Erpingham Camp ; this controversial choice was given the 'green light' by his classics master, James Morwood. Later, Curtis commented that Morwood’s support had helped him understand that it was all right ‘’to push boundaries and to be funny.” Curtis didn’t approve of fagging at the school, and at 18, when he became head of his house, he banned it.

He achieved a first-class Bachelor of Arts in English Language and Literature at Christ Church, Oxford. At the University of Oxford, he met and began working with Rowan Atkinson, after they both joined the scriptwriting team of the Etceteras revue, part of the Experimental Theatre Club. He appeared in the company's "After Eights" at the Oxford Playhouse in May 1976.

Early writing career
Collaborating with Rowan Atkinson in the Oxford Revue, he appeared alongside him at his breakthrough Edinburgh Fringe show. As a result, he was commissioned to co-write the BBC Radio 3 series The Atkinson People with Atkinson in 1978, which was broadcast in 1979. He then began to write comedy for film and TV. He was a regular writer on the BBC comedy series Not the Nine O'Clock News, where he wrote many of the show's songs with Howard Goodall and many satirical sketches, often with Rowan Atkinson. Curtis co-wrote with Philip Pope the Hee Bee Gee Bees' single "Meaningless Songs (In Very High Voices)" released in 1980 to parody the style of a series of Bee Gees' disco hits. In 1984 and 1985, Curtis wrote material for ITV's satirical puppet show Spitting Image.

First with Atkinson and later with Ben Elton, Curtis then wrote the Blackadder series from 1983 to 1989, each season focusing on a different era in British history. Atkinson played the lead throughout, but Curtis was the only writer who participated in every episode of Blackadder. The pair continued their collaboration with the comedy series Mr. Bean, which ran from 1990 to 1995.

Curtis had by then already begun writing feature films. His first was The Tall Guy (1989), a romantic comedy starring Jeff Goldblum, Emma Thompson and Rowan Atkinson and produced by Working Title films. The TV movie Bernard and the Genie followed in 1991.

In 1994, Curtis created and co-wrote The Vicar of Dibley for comedian Dawn French, which was a great success. In an online poll conducted in 2004 Britain's Best Sitcom, it was voted the third-best sitcom in British history and Blackadder the second-best, making Curtis the only screenwriter to create two shows in the poll's top 10 programmes.

Film career
Curtis achieved his breakthrough success with the romantic comedy Four Weddings and a Funeral. The 1994 film, starring Hugh Grant and Andie MacDowell, was produced on a limited budget by the British production company Working Title Films. Curtis chose Mike Newell to direct the film after watching his TV film Ready When You Are, Mr. McGill. Four Weddings and a Funeral proved to be the top-grossing British film in history at that time. It made an international star of Grant, and Curtis' Oscar nomination for the script catapulted him to prominence (though the Oscar went to Quentin Tarantino and Roger Avary for Pulp Fiction). The film was also nominated for Best Picture, but lost to Forrest Gump.

Curtis' next film was also for Working Title, which has remained his artistic home ever since. 1997's Bean brought Mr. Bean to the big screen and was a huge hit around the world. He continued his association with Working Title writing the 1999 romantic comedy Notting Hill, starring Hugh Grant and Julia Roberts, which broke the record set by Four Weddings and a Funeral to become the top-grossing British film. The story of a lonely travel bookstore owner who falls in love with the world's most famous movie star was directed by Roger Michell.

Curtis next co-wrote the screen adaptation of the international bestseller Bridget Jones's Diary for Working Title. Curtis knew the novel's writer Helen Fielding. Indeed, he has credited her with saying that his original script for Four Weddings and a Funeral was too upbeat and needed the addition of the titular funeral.

Two years later, Curtis re-teamed with Working Title to write and direct Love Actually. Curtis has said in interviews that the sprawling, multi-character structure of Love Actually owes a debt to his favourite film, Robert Altman's Nashville. The film featured a "Who's Who" of UK actors, including Hugh Grant, Colin Firth, Bill Nighy, Emma Thompson, Liam Neeson, Andrew Lincoln, Alan Rickman and Keira Knightley, in a loosely connected series of stories about people in and out of love in London in the weeks leading up to Christmas. Its regular festive screening has seen it labelled as being arguably a modern-day Christmas staple.

Curtis followed this in 2004 with work as co-writer on Bridget Jones: The Edge of Reason, the sequel to Bridget Jones's Diary. Curtis then wrote the screenplay to The Girl in the Café, a television film directed by David Yates and produced by the BBC and HBO as part of the Make Poverty History campaign's Live 8 efforts in 2005. The film stars Bill Nighy as a civil servant and Kelly Macdonald as a young woman he falls in love with at a fictional G8 summit in Iceland. Macdonald's character pushes him to ask whether the developed countries of the world cannot do more to help the most impoverished. The film was timed to air just before the Gleneagles G8 summit in 2005. It received three Emmy Awards in 2006, including Outstanding Made for Television Movie, Supporting Actress in a Miniseries or a Movie for Kelly Macdonald and a Primetime Emmy Award for Outstanding Writing for a Miniseries, Movie or a Dramatic Special trophy for Curtis himself. Curtis said of Yates' direction that he made "a much more beautiful film, and a surprising film and a better film than I could possibly have made."

In May 2007, he received the BAFTA Fellowship at the British Academy Television Awards in recognition of his successful career in film and television and his charity efforts. Curtis next co-wrote with Anthony Minghella an adaptation of Alexander McCall Smith's novel, The No. 1 Ladies' Detective Agency, which Minghella shot in mid-2007 in Botswana. It premiered on the BBC on 23 March 2008, just days after Minghella's death. The film did not run in the US until early 2009, when HBO aired it as the pilot of a resulting six-episode TV series with the same cast, on which Curtis served as executive producer.

His second film as writer/director, The Boat That Rocked, was released in 2009. The film was set in 1966 in the era of British pirate radio. It followed a group of DJs on a pirate radio station run from a boat in the North Sea. The film starred Philip Seymour Hoffman, Bill Nighy, Nick Frost, Rhys Ifans, Gemma Arterton and Kenneth Branagh. The film was a commercial and critical disappointment in the UK. Curtis re-edited the film for its US release where it was re-titled Pirate Radio, but also failed to find an audience. He followed that with War Horse, which he rewrote for director Steven Spielberg based on an earlier script by playwright Lee Hall. Curtis was recommended to Spielberg by DreamWorks Studio executive Stacey Snider, who had worked with Curtis during her time at Universal Studios. Curtis's work on the World War I-set Blackadder Goes Forth meant he was already familiar with the period.

Curtis then wrote Mary and Martha, a BBC/HBO television film directed by Phillip Noyce. The film starred Hilary Swank and Brenda Blethyn as two women who bond after they both lose their sons to malaria. The film was broadcast in the UK on 1 March 2013. He next wrote and directed About Time, a romantic comedy/drama about time travel and family love. It starred Rachel McAdams, Domhnall Gleeson, Bill Nighy, Tom Hollander, Margot Robbie, Lydia Wilson and Vanessa Kirby. It was released in the UK on 4 September 2013. Soon after the film came out, Curtis delivered a screenwriting lecture as part of the BAFTA and BFI Screenwriters' Lecture Series. He followed that with Trash, which he adapted from the novel by Andy Mulligan for director Stephen Daldry. With three unknown Brazilian children in the lead roles, the film co-starred Wagner Moura, Rooney Mara and Martin Sheen. It was filmed in 2013 in Rio de Janeiro and released in Brazil on 9 October 2014 and in the UK on 30 January 2015.

He next wrote Roald Dahl's Esio Trot, a BBC television film adaptation of Roald Dahl's classic children's novel. Receiving acclaim, the film starred Dustin Hoffman and Judi Dench, with James Corden as the narrator, was directed by Dearbhla Walsh and was broadcast on BBC on 1 January 2015. His next film, Yesterday, was adapted from an original screenplay by Jack Barth (who received only "co-story" credit, reportedly at Curtis's insistence). The film, directed by Danny Boyle and starring Lily James and Himesh Patel, follows a young man who discovers that the entire world except for him has no memory of the Beatles, allowing him to become a global pop star by performing their songs as his own. While Barth's original screenplay depicted an obscure musician unable to capitalize on his windfall, Curtis's more conventional script featured an independent musician unable to control his own career once the music industry takes over. It began filming on 21 April 2018 and was released on 28 June 2019.

Campaigning
Curtis together with Lenny Henry are co-founders and co-creators of Comic Relief and Red Nose Day. Curtis is also a founder of Make Poverty History. He organised the Live 8 concerts with Bob Geldof to publicise poverty, particularly in Africa, and pressure G8 leaders to adopt his proposals for ending it. He has written of his work in The Observer in the Global development section in 2005.

Curtis helped spearhead the launch of the Robin Hood tax campaign in 2010. The campaign fights for a 0.05% tax levied on each bank trade ranging from shares to foreign exchange and derivatives that could generate $700bn worldwide and be spent on measures to combat domestic and international poverty as well as fight climate change.

He talked the producer of American Idol into doing a show wherein celebrities journeyed into Africa and experienced the level of poverty for themselves. It was called American Idol: Idol Gives Back. In 2014, Curtis publicly backed "Hacked Off" and its campaign in support of UK press self-regulation by "safeguarding the press from political interference while also giving vital protection to the vulnerable."

In August 2014, Curtis was one of 200 public figures who were signatories to a letter to The Guardian opposing Scottish independence in the run-up to September's referendum on that issue.

Controversy
In October 2010, a short film created by Curtis titled No Pressure was released by the 10:10 campaign in Britain to promote climate change politics. The film depicted a series of scenes in which people were asked if they were going to participate in the 10:10 campaign, told there was "no pressure" to do so, but if they did not, they were blown up at the press of a red button.
Reaction was mixed, but the video was swiftly removed from the organisation's website.

In March 2011, Curtis apologised following a complaint by the British Stammering Association about 2011 Comic Relief's opening skit, a parody by Lenny Henry of the 2010 film The King's Speech.

Personal life
Curtis lives in Notting Hill and has a country house in Walberswick, Suffolk with broadcaster Emma Freud; they have four children, including writer and activist Scarlet. He previously dated Anne Strutt, now Baroness Jenkin of Kennington, before her marriage to Sir Bernard Jenkin, a Member of Parliament (MP). Curtis has named characters in his writing Bernard (reputedly after Bernard Jenkin). It is claimed he used the Jenkins' wedding as inspiration for Four Weddings and a Funeral. He is irreligious.

Filmography

Film

Television
TV series

TV movies

Other awards and nominations

See also
 Comic Relief
 Live 8
 Skinhead Hamlet

References

External links

 
 BBC Comedy Guide entry
 Richard Curtis interview at the Latitude Festival, BAFTA webcast, July 2007
 Interview with Richard Curtis by Laurie Taylor in New Humanist magazine
 Stars pay tribute to Richard Curtis in a BAFTA video
 No Pressure on YouTube

 
1956 births
Living people
Alumni of Christ Church, Oxford
BAFTA fellows
English people of Australian descent
English people of Czech descent
Commanders of the Order of the British Empire
English film directors
English screenwriters
English male screenwriters
English television writers
New Zealand emigrants to England
People educated at Harrow School
People educated at Papplewick School
People from Walberswick
People from Wellington City
Primetime Emmy Award winners
Writers Guild of America Award winners
English-language film directors
British male television writers
Comic Relief people
Freud family